"Scream & Shout" is a song by will.i.am featuring Britney Spears.

Scream and Shout may also refer to:
Screaming
Scream and Shout, an EP by KLOQ
Scream and Shout, an album by Coretta Scott 2005
"Scream and Shout", a song by Timofey & Brenes ft. Terri B! 2011
"Scream and Shout", a song by Instant Funk 1979